= Wandinidae =

Scientific classification
- Domain: Eukaryota
- Kingdom: Animalia
- Phylum: Arthropoda
- Class: Malacostraca
- Order: Amphipoda
- Superfamily: Aristioidea
- Family: Wandinidae

Family of crustaceans

Wandinidae is a family of crustaceans belonging to the order Amphipoda.

Genera:

- Pseudocyphocaris Ledoyer, 1986
- Wandin Lowry & Stoddart, 1990
